Michael Alan Carey (born July 4, 1958) is the former head coach of the West Virginia University women's basketball team. He had previously served as head basketball coach for the Salem International University men's basketball team.

Carey played basketball for Salem International University, earning a letter in each of his four years at the school. In his freshman year, he was named the West Virginia Intercollegiate Athletic Conference freshman of the year, an honor his son would win in 2006.

High school
Born and raised in Clarksburg, West Virginia, Carey was active in three sports while attending Liberty High School.

College career
Carey played basketball each of his four years at Salem. He was named the West Virginia Intercollegiate Athletic Conference(WVIAC) freshman of the year in 1977. He went on to be the conference scoring leader in 1978, and earned MVP honors for Salem in 1979. In that year, he was also named to the WVIAC all-conference team. In his four years at Salem, he scored over 2,000 points. Carey was named to the Salem Athletic Hall of Fame in 1993.

Coaching career

Flemington and Clarksburg Liberty
After graduating from Salem in 1980 with a degree in physical education, Carey was offered a position to be an assistant coach of the boys' team at the high school Flemington, West Virginia. Carey was interested, but the job offer came with a catch. He also had to be the head coach of the girls' team. He accepted the offer. He went on to coach girls' basketball at the high school level for seven years, in Flemington and at Liberty High School in Clarksburg, West Virginia. In his final year as high school coach, he earned coach of the year honors from Harrison County and coached the team to the regional finals.

Salem
Carey returned to his alma mater and became the assistant coach for the Salem men's basketball program in 1987. After one year as an assistant he became the head coach in 1988. The program did not have a history of success, posting an 8–19 record in the year before he took over, but Carey coached the team to a winning record in his first year as head coach. In thirteen seasons, his teams had only one losing record. In nine of the thirteen years, the team won more than 20 games. Twice, the teams made it to the Division II Elite eight and in 1997, the team made it to the Division II Final Four.

Carey celebrated his milestone 250th victory on January 29, 2000, in an 86–76 victory over Shepherd College. At the time, he had coached teams to the West Virginia Intercollegiate Athletic Conference championship five times. By the time he completed his coaching career at Salem, teams he coached made seven post-season appearances, with five in the NCAA division II tournaments, and two in the NAIA tournaments.

West Virginia

Carey took over a team that had only five wins in its previous season. In his first season, the team improved to 14–14, and has had only one losing season since (15–16 in 2005–06). On January 29, 2008, West Virginia would upset Rutgers University, then ranked #4 in the country, representing the highest ranked team they had beaten in school history.

In 2007–08, the team earned its first top 20 ranking in school history, reaching as high as 11th place in both major polls. They ended the year at 25–8, and advanced to the second round of the NCAA tournament.

In 2009–10, West Virginia won a school-record 29 games. The team was ranked as high as #7 in the AP Poll during the year, and reached  semi-finals of the Big East women's basketball tournament, only to fall to Connecticut. Despite the success of the year, Carey still has not achieved one of his goals—to beat Connecticut. He said, "This is my 10th year and we've beat every team in the conference except Connecticut". The team was undefeated at home for only the second time in program history. The Big East voted him co-coach of the year, along with Geno Auriemma.

Carey's 200th win at West Virginia occurred on February 19, 2011, in a game against Pittsburgh. West Virginia had failed to win in their previous three attempts to reach the 200 win milestone, but the team prevailed against Pittsburgh 90–79.

After a 24–10 season in 2011, Carey's Mountaineers lost five seniors to graduation. The team has four incoming freshman, a class ranked #21, by ESPNU HoopGurlz.

On December 28, Carey's team helped him reach a milestone–his 500th career victory. The game didn't start out like it would finish—opponent Bucknell University started out with a 6–2 lead before the Mountaineers ran off 12 straight points to take a large lead. West Virginia ended up winning easily, 72–30, leading to Carey's 212th win at West Virginia, and his 500th career victory, after 228 wins at Salem.

Carey's team achieved their biggest win in basketball history on February 12, 2011, when they beat Notre Dame at Notre Dame 65–53. Notre Dame had only a single loss prior to the win, and was ranked # 2 in the nation, by both the AP and ESPN Coaches poll.

Head coaching record

Personal
Mike Carey is married to Cheryl (Minnix) Carey. Together, they have four children—Chris, Chelsy, Craig and Chelby. Chris played basketball for Fairmont State, where he won the West Virginia Intercollegiate Athletic Conference freshman of the year, an award also won by his father. Craig played on the practice team for the women's team, a team made up of men and women who serve as a practice squad for the varsity team. He is now on the West Virginia University men's basketball team. Chelsy Carey is on the cheer leading squad for the women's team. Chelby Carey played basketball for the Morgantown High School girls' basketball team.

Awards and honors
 1977 West Virginia Intercollegiate Athletic Conference freshman of the year
 2004 Big East Coach of the Year
 2010 Big East Coach of the Year

References

External links
 West Virginia bio

1958 births
Living people
American women's basketball coaches
American men's basketball players
Basketball coaches from West Virginia
Basketball players from West Virginia
High school basketball coaches in West Virginia
Salem Tigers men's basketball players
Sportspeople from Clarksburg, West Virginia
West Virginia Mountaineers women's basketball coaches